Ali Kalbi (also Romanized as ʿAlī Kalbī; also known as Qeshlāq-e ʿAlī Kalbī) is a village in Qeshlaq Rural District, Abish Ahmad District, Kaleybar County, East Azerbaijan Province, Iran. At the 2006 census, its population was 33, in 7 families.

References 

Populated places in Kaleybar County